The 2016 Brazilian Grand Prix (officially known as the Formula One Grande Prêmio do Brasil 2016) was a Formula One motor race held on 13 November 2016 at the Autódromo José Carlos Pace in São Paulo, Brazil. At the race duration of a little over 3 hours, the race was the longest Brazilian Grand Prix in history.

Winner of the previous year's race Nico Rosberg entered the round with a 19-point lead over his teammate Lewis Hamilton in the World Drivers' Championship. Their team, Mercedes, had already clinched the World Constructors' Championship, holding a lead of two hundred and fifty-two points over Red Bull Racing, with third place Scuderia Ferrari another sixty-two points behind. Hamilton took pole position and won the race from Rosberg to take the championship to the final round in Abu Dhabi. Max Verstappen finished third, having dropped to 16th after a pit stop with 16 laps to go.

Qualifying

Notes
  – Esteban Ocon received a three-place grid penalty for impeding Jolyon Palmer during Q1.

Race
The track was very wet at the start so the race began behind the safety car until the start of Lap 8. Lewis Hamilton built up an early lead. Marcus Ericsson crashed on lap 12 on the pit straight bringing the safety car back out again. The race restarted again six laps later only for Kimi Räikkönen to crash on the pit straight immediately, spinning across the track before hitting the wall. The race was red flagged and there was a 35-minute delay before restarting again behind the safety car, however seven laps later it was again red flagged as the conditions were deemed still too dangerous.

After another 25 minute delay the race started again behind the safety car, which finally pulled in after another three laps. Late on in the race Felipe Massa crashed near the pit entry bringing the safety car out again, while walking back to the garage Massa was given applause from several teams and was visibly emotional, as it was expected to be his last Grand Prix in his home country.

The race restarted again and Hamilton went on to win the race from Championship leader Nico Rosberg and Max Verstappen.

Race classification 

Notes
  – Daniel Ricciardo received a 5-second penalty for entering the pit lane when the entry was closed.
  – Felipe Massa received a 5-second penalty for overtaking before the safety car line.
  – Romain Grosjean crashed on the way from the pit lane to the starting grid.

Championship standings after the race

Drivers' Championship standings

Constructors' Championship standings

 Note: Only the top five positions are included for the sets of standings.
 Bold text indicates who still had a theoretical chance of becoming World Champion.

Notes

References

External links

Brazilian
Brazilian Grand Prix
2016 in Brazilian motorsport
Brazilian Grand Prix